Gokinjo  is the Japanese word for "neighborhood". Its use can refer to titles such as:
Gokinjo Bōkentai, a 1996 video game
Gokinjo Monogatari, a Japanese manga series